Strati Iliev (born 15 October 1973) is a Bulgarian footballer currently playing for Botev Kozloduy as a midfielder. Strati is a defensive midfielder.

He had previously played for PFC Nesebar, PFC Lokomotiv Stara Zagora and Finnish clubs Tampere United, FC Jokerit and FC Jazz.

References

Bulgarian footballers
Bulgarian expatriate footballers
Expatriate footballers in Finland
1974 births
Living people
First Professional Football League (Bulgaria) players
FC Jokerit players
FC Jazz players
PFC Nesebar players
PFC Lokomotiv Mezdra players
Veikkausliiga players
Bulgarian expatriate sportspeople in Finland
Association football midfielders